B'z Live-Gym Hidden Pleasure 〜Typhoon No.20〜 is the eighteenth live DVD released by Japanese rock duo B'z, on December 10, 2008. Following the release of two compilations to celebrate the band 20 years of career, this DVD is also a compilation featuring live footage of several different "Live-Gyms" by them.

Track listing

Disc 1 
 Fireball
 
 
 Blowin'
 Be There
 
 Don't Leave Me
 
 Oh! Girl
 Deep Kiss
 Real Thing Shakes
 
 Time

Disc 2 
 Calling 
 Ring
 Motel
  
 
 
 Zero
 Liar! Liar!
 juice
 
 
 ultra soul
 
 
 Banzai
 Run

Disc 3 
 Spirit LOOSE" 「Opening Movie」
# 1090 -Thousand Dreams-
 
 
 
 
 Skin
 Logic
 
 "juice" 「1CAM」
 "juice" 「2CAM」
 "juice" 「3CAM」

Certifications

Personnel 

Takahiro Matsumoto - producer, guitar
Koshi Inaba - vocalist

External links 
B'z Official Website 

B'z video albums
2008 video albums
Live video albums
2008 live albums